Burke & Hare is a 2010 British black comedy film, loosely based on the Burke and Hare murders of 1828. Directed by John Landis from an original screenplay by Nick Moorcroft and Piers Ashworth, the film stars Simon Pegg and Andy Serkis as William Burke and William Hare respectively. It was Landis's first feature film release in 12 years, the last being 1998's Susan's Plan. The film was released in the United Kingdom on 29 October 2010.

Plot
William Burke and William Hare, immigrants from Ulster, attempt to sell cheese mould as a patent medicine. When their fraud is discovered, they flee to an inn owned by Hare's wife, Lucky. One of her lodgers has died, and she wants Burke and Hare to remove the body. On the way, they stop for a drink and Hare hears from Fergus, a local henchman of villain Danny McTavish, that Dr Knox pays for cadavers, especially now demand has gone up. Burke and Hare decide to sell the corpse to Knox. They are forced to break the corpse's spine to fit it into a barrel in order to smuggle it through the city. Burke and Hare present the now-mangled corpse to Knox. After some negotiation, Knox agrees to pay them a good sum of money for each corpse they bring him for dissection.

Burke and Hare try grave-digging to procure more cadavers. They accidentally dig up a long-dead body and are then caught by the militia, who chase them out of the cemetery, shooting Burke in the rear end in the pursuit. Back at the inn, they find Lucky drunk and barely conscious. Lucky says she is drinking because Joseph, another lodger at the inn, is near death. Not willing to wait for the outcome, Burke and Hare suffocate Joseph and take the body to Knox. Flush with money, Burke and Hare dress up for a night in a posher pub. There they meet a young former prostitute, Ginny Hawkins, who performs an excerpt from Macbeth to the indifferent patrons. Burke is instantly taken with Ginny.

Hare comes home to find Lucky in good spirits and waiting with a home-cooked meal. He is suspicious, then scared when Lucky tells him she knows what he and Burke have been up to. Surprisingly, she thinks it a good idea and makes Hare give her a pound per corpse as a tax between man and wife.

Burke is kidnapped and bundled into a carriage by McTavish and Fergus, who have already captured Hare. McTavish threatens to kill them unless they give him half the money from Knox. Forced to agree, they are then thrown from the carriage. As they trek back to the inn, they plan a string of murders to make up their losses to McTavish.

The people of Edinburgh becomes suspicious of all the deaths in the area, as does police captain Tom McLintock of the militia. Missing posters of the dead are put up and Burke begins to panic. Hare says they have finished the murders and will go into the funeral parlour business.

McTavish kidnaps Hare again and attempts to extort the remainder of the money. Shortly afterward, McTavish appears as Knox's next dissection cadaver, where McLintock recognises his body. He discovers Knox's collection of anatomical photographs, recognising many of the photos as people who were reported missing. Knox confesses his arrangement with Burke and Hare. McLintock arrests Burke and Ginny, and Hare and Lucky, while both couples are having sex.

In prison, Burke is repentant, but Hare tells him not to confess or all of them, including the women, will be hanged. Meanwhile, the Solicitor General and the Lord Provost want to keep the scandal out of the papers, as the news would ruin the reputation of Edinburgh's medical schools and the money they generate. They bribe McLintock into a deal by making him a colonel. Knox's anatomical photographs are destroyed.

McLintock tells the prisoners that if any one of them confesses to the murders, the others will go free. Burke agrees to confess if he and Ginny can finish what they were doing when McLintock apprehended them.

Just before Burke's hanging, Angus asks Burke for his final words. Seeing Ginny in the crowd, Burke says that he did it for love.

Onscreen text over the credits describes the fates of all the characters in the story, concluding with an image of the actual skeleton of William Burke at the Anatomical Museum of the University of Edinburgh Medical School.

Cast

 Simon Pegg as William Burke
 Andy Serkis as William Hare
 Isla Fisher as Ginny Hawkins
 Tom Wilkinson as Dr Robert Knox
 Tim Curry as Prof. Alexander Monro
 Jessica Hynes as Lucky
 Bill Bailey as Angus the Hangman
 Hugh Bonneville as Lord Harrington
 Allan Corduner as Joseph Nicephore Niepce
 Simon Farnaby as William Wordsworth 
 David Hayman as Danny McTavish
 David Schofield as Fergus
 Ronnie Corbett as Capt. Tom McLintock
 Reece Shearsmith as Sgt. McKenzie
 Christian Brassington as Charles
 Michael Smiley as Patterson
 Christopher Lee as Old Joseph
 Jenny Agutter as Lucy
 Georgia King as Emma
 John Woodvine as Lord Provost
 Steven Spiers as McMartin's doorman
 Stephen Merchant as Holyrood Footman
 Paul Whitehouse as Gentleman drunk
 Michael Winner as Gentleman passenger
 Max Landis as Handsome coachman
 Ray Harryhausen as Distinguished doctor
 Seamus (Irish Wolfhound) as himself

Production

Development
Burke & Hare was developed by Ealing Studios, who had been known for producing acclaimed black comedy films such as Kind Hearts and Coronets and The Ladykillers. John Landis read the screenplay, which piqued his interest in making the film. Landis wanted the film to be similar in style to Ealing's black comedies, as well as to the films of Laurel and Hardy, describing the portrayal of Burke and Hare in this film as an "evil Laurel and Hardy".

Casting
David Tennant was originally cast in the role of William Hare, but left the production before principal photography began; he was replaced by Andy Serkis.

Many cast members of the sitcom Spaced appear, including Simon Pegg, Jessica Hynes, Bill Bailey, Reece Shearsmith and Michael Smiley.

Three actors from the John Landis film An American Werewolf in London appear: Jenny Agutter, David Schofield and John Woodvine. Landis' son Max also makes a cameo appearance.

Filming
Filming took place around Edinburgh with some scenes also being shot in Stirling, London and at Knole in Kent, and also at Ealing Studios. The script was written by Piers Ashworth and Nick Moorcroft, who previously wrote St Trinian's, also for Ealing, which was the highest grossing British independent film of the last 10 years.

Landis stated:

The first official trailer for the film was released on 5 October 2010. It was shown in some UK cinemas before Paranormal Activity 2.

It was released on 29 October 2010.

Reception

Rotten Tomatoes, a review aggregator, reports that 33% of 58 surveyed critics gave the film a positive review; the average rating was 4.9/10. The website's critics consensus reads: "Marked by timid scares and flat-footed humor, Burke and Hare is a missed opportunity for its talented cast and a disappointing return for director John Landis."  Nathan Rabin of The A.V. Club rated it B and called it a "minor but welcome return" for Landis. Neil Genzlinger of The New York Times described it as "a ghoulish comedy" not for nitpickers. Charles Gant of Variety called it an "amiable, creaky comedy" that represents "a step back from the brink" for Landis. Ray Bennett of The Hollywood Reporter wrote that it is "unpleasant drivel that tries to make fun out of murder."

See also
 The Greed of William Hart (1948)
 The Flesh and the Fiends (1960)
 Burke & Hare (1972)
 The Doctor and the Devils (1985)

References

External links
 
 
 
 

2010 films
2010 black comedy films
2010s historical comedy films
2010s serial killer films
British black comedy films
British crime comedy films
British historical comedy films
British serial killer films
Comedy films based on actual events
Cultural depictions of William Burke and Hare
Films directed by John Landis
Films set in 1828
Films set in Edinburgh
Films shot in Buckinghamshire
Films shot in Bedfordshire
Films shot in Edinburgh
Films shot in Stirling (council area)
Films shot in London
Films shot in Kent
Grave-robbing in film
2010s English-language films
2010s British films